Once We Were Trees is the second album by American alt-country band Beachwood Sparks, released in 2001.

Track listing
"Germination"
"Confusion Is Nothing New"
"The Sun Surrounds Me"
"You Take the Gold"
"Hearts Mend"
"Let It Run"
"Old Manatee"
"The Hustler"
"Yer Selfish Ways"
"By Your Side"
"Close Your Eyes"
"Banjo Press Conference"
"Jugglers' Revenge"
"The Good Night Whistle"
"Once We Were Trees" –
"By Your Side" is partially based on Sade's song of the same name.

Beachwood Sparks albums
2001 albums
Sub Pop albums